The Third Andrews ministry  is the 71st and current ministry of the Government of Victoria. The Labor government, led by Premier Daniel Andrews and Deputy Premier Jacinta Allan, was officially sworn in on 5 December 2022, following the party's third consecutive victory at the 2022 state election, which was held on 26 November 2022.

At the time of its formation the ministry consisted of 22 ministers, fourteen of whom were women.

The Third Andrews ministry succeeded the Second Andrews ministry.

Third Andrews ministry, 2022–present 
The cabinet composition of the first arrangement of the Third Andrews Ministry was first announced on 2 December 2022. As a result of the defection of seven MPs from the Labor Right to Andrew's Labor Left faction, Shaun Leane from the previous ministry was removed from cabinet by the caucus. In compensation, Leane would be nominated as the President of the Legislative Council in the upcoming parliament. Jaala Pulford from the previous ministry retired at the 2022 election, creating a vacancy in the cabinet. In their places, Enver Erdogan and Natalie Suleyman were promoted to the cabinet.

The ministerial portfolios were then announced on 5 December 2022, with ministers (except Harriet Shing) sworn in that day. Shing was sworn in on 14 December when her re-election to the Legislative Council was declared and finalised, with Andrews holding on to her portfolios in the interim.

Parliamentary Secretaries

References

External links
 Ministers, Parliament of Victoria

Cabinets established in 2022
Victoria (Australia) ministries
2022 establishments in Australia
Australian Labor Party ministries in Victoria (Australia)
Ministries of Charles III